Hellinsia sublatus is a moth of the family Pterophoridae. It is found in Mexico and Costa Rica.

The wingspan is 17–18 mm. The antennae are pale fawn and the head is white with a pale fawn-brown collar behind. The thorax is white, dusted with pale fawn. The forewings are white, dusted with pale fawn, especially in a subcostal shade from near the base to near the apex, and peppered with a few darker brownish scales. The hindwings are pale brownish grey. Adults are on wing in July and August, at an altitude of 1,800 to 2,450 metres.

References

Moths described in 1915
sublatus
Moths of Central America